"Look Through My Window" is a song recorded by the American vocal group The Mamas & the Papas. It was written by John Philips, c. 1964 during a temporary separation from his partner, Michelle Phillips. The song was inspired by the fact that although John thought Michelle was out in California, she in fact was just blocks away in Greenwich Village. The mono version has a slightly longer fade-out so that the closing refrain "And the rain beats on my roof" is sung 9 times.

The song was the lead-off single from the group's third album The Mamas & The Papas Deliver.  After all 3 of the group's prior singles reached the Top 5 on Billboard's Top 100 Chart in the USA, expectations were high.  Surprisingly, the song reached a peak of number 24 in the United States, and failed to chart in the UK. As a result, - as recounted by John Phillips in his autobiography, Papa John - the decision was made to release another single from the group's second album.

Cash Box said that it is a "soft-rocker, complete with the lush ork workout that has become their trademark" that they thought would be a "sure-fire money-maker."

Track listing
7" Vinyl
"Look Through My Window" (Phillips) — 3:05
"Once Was a Time I Thought" (Phillips) — 0:58

References

The Mamas and the Papas songs
1966 singles
Songs written by John Phillips (musician)
Song recordings produced by Lou Adler
Dunhill Records singles
1966 songs